Interactive Autism Network (IAN) is a research registry which matches researchers and their studies to families who qualify to participate in and benefit from the research. The network closed to new participants in 2019. IAN facilitates ongoing research in autism spectrum disorders (ASDs). The goal is to accomplish research that advances understanding and treatment of ASDs. IAN was established in 2006 at the Kennedy Krieger Institute, and is funded by Autism Speaks and the Simons Foundation.

IAN is an online (research registry) database that connects family members of autistic people with researchers in an effort to help solve the many problems associated with autism. Today there are over 30,000 individuals registered on IAN. On April 2, 2007, the Interactive Autism Network was founded by Drs. Paul and Kiely Law at the Kennedy Krieger Institute in Baltimore, Maryland. The IAN project is supported by grant money from a non-profit organization called Autism Speaks.

References

Autism-related organizations in the United States
Mental health organizations in Maryland
2006 establishments in Maryland